Odeon Kino (formerly SF Kino) is the largest cinema group in Norway with over 200 employees with cinemas in 10 cities. It is fully owned by AMC Theatres through Filmstaden AB.

It changed its name from SF Kino to Odeon Kino after being purchased by AMC Theatres in 2018.

References

Cinemas and movie theaters chains
Cinemas in Norway
AMC Theatres
2018 mergers and acquisitions